The Fearless Four (German: Die furchtlosen Vier) is a 1997 German animated musical film loosely based on the folk tale of the "Town Musicians of Bremen" by the Brothers Grimm, about four funny animals that all have one thing in common: they want to sing, but can't for assorted reasons. Combining traditional animation with computer animation, the film was produced by Munich Animation and released by the German unit of Warner Bros. under the Warner Bros. Family Entertainment label. Producer Eberhard Junkersdorf won a Bavarian Film Award in 1998 for "Best Production".

Plot 
The film follows the carefree lives of the easygoing bloodhound Buster, the woeful donkey Fred, the graceful Siamese cat Gwendolyn and the self-assured rooster Tortellini.

The film first begins with Buster, who likes to sing and dance instead of doing his job to hunt foxes. His owners notice this and make a deal with one of the workers for the food factory, Mix Max (Stands for Mix and Match) owned to kill and stuff him, which they agree to it. Buster starts to worry, and tries to escape from being stuffed, which makes the worker chase him pull his tail. This makes Buster angry; he attacks them and then escapes.

Fred, an aged, fragile, donkey worked as a slave for his newly-replaced owner and sings about his life. His owner is angry that Fred is singing instead of working, sells him to Mix Max, and replaces him with a robot centaur named PowerTool, due to him being not helpful to work. A female bee helps Fred escape by leading other bees to swarm at a driver in a truck with Fred hostage. When Fred is freed, signs for the direction to Bremen and Paris on the road have been switched/turned around. Fred falls onto a tree, and meets a napping Buster. They have a conversation about wanting to be famous, singing animals and decide to travel to either one of the two cities and also choose where to go to become famous singers by spinning a bone, to see if it stops on Bremen or Paris. It stops on Paris (which is actually Bremen), and they start going there.

Gwendolyn, a Siamese cat, is sad after her owner, Aunt Wanda died. The people who inherited her estate only care about finding two gems and not taking care of her cat. They are upset that Aunt Wanda did not tell them where they are located in her farewell address and thinks that Gwendolyn knows where they are, and keeps them secret. They try to kill her with milk with a drop of poison, but fail with their attempt. They hire a worker for Mix Max to kill her. Also, the kid that's belongs to the two inheritor's (Difficult to say exactly) tries to kill her, but they all fail, and she traps them in the basement. After her escape, she meets up with Buster and Fred, who have heard her sing, and agree to let her join them on the journey.

Tortellini the rooster gets kicked out of his home after his wife gets mad at him after having an affair with a duck. He gets captured by a Mix Max worker, but is freed after a tree branch hits the cage. After meeting the three journeying animals, Fred kicks the cage to let him off, after demanding to get out. Tortellini talks to them about being a great singer, which annoys them; they leave him, but he goes with them. On their way, they meet an owl who tells them they are going the wrong direction to Paris (they are heading toward Bremen) and says it is dangerous in Bremen, but the animals continue on.

The town of Bremen is led by an evil scientist named Dr. Greed, the leader of the Mix Max factory. After trying to catch attention to the people of Bremen, Platini, and Dr. Sevenbrains, workers of Mix Max eventually notices their talent and wants them to work for the factory, to improve the factory's image and sing a famous jingle to make people buy their sausage products for profits. Though they become famous, the animals get bored singing the same jingle all the time. They try to get a change in music, but get rejected the idea. The animals start to notice that the company owns their voices, and their freedom.

After an attempt to fight back, the animals end up getting thrown in a prison except Fred, who gets tickled in a machine until he passes out and gets tired. After he gets thrown in, a mouse called Mozart tries to help them escape but can't, due to being too small. They eventually escape by Tortellini pulling Buster's tail while he sings to try to get help which makes him angry, and leads to him breaking the bars. While escaping the factory, the animals see Mix Max's scheme of caging animals to make there way to be slaughtered to make their sausages and try to promise to save them from being slaughtered. Eventually, During an election, the four animals protest with a song for the usage of lots of animals for the companie's sausages. They catch the attention with the people at the election, and cause a riot with tomatoes. After Dr. Greed, Platini, Dr. Sevenbrains, and a manager for the factory (Mix Max) escape, the animals trick and scare them by looking like a 8-eyed monster the owl mentioned earlier, and trapping them under a movable tiled floor after a battle between the animals and Dr. Greed and his henchmen (Platini, Dr. Sevenbrains, the manager for Mix Max) at their headquarters to get the remote that can free the animals out their cages. After they free the animals, Tortellini accidentally destroys the Mix Max factory after messing with the remote. The animals celebrate after the destruction of the factory and the four live together in a house with animals. Buster and Gwendolyn admits their feelings for each other and sing together with Tortellini and Fred accompanied them. The Owl from earlier appears from the top of the screen and looks the audience before closing the sheets and sleeps as the movie ends.

Cast

Production 
Production began in March 1995 (when Munich Animation was founded), and ended production in December 1996. 150 people globally worked on the film, which included animators from the computer animation field working on the backgrounds, the robot centaur (Powertool) and the vehicles. The 2D animation was colored digitally. The film was produced and recorded for an English audience, and was later dubbed into German for its original release.

Release 
In North America, the English version was released on Warner Home Video on May 7, 1998, however, the VHS went quickly out of print and remains extremely hard to find. Germany received a DVD release twice; a regular release, and one from Warner Kids (a label for Warner Bros. films that were family-friendly) using the original name, Die Bremer Stadtmusikanten; neither DVD has any English audio and subtitle options. A much easier to find PAL VHS was released in the United Kingdom on July 19, 1999. Despite the film being pretty much unknown in the United States and in most of the world, the English dub is currently available on sources such as Vudu, iTunes, Amazon Prime Video and the Microsoft Store. In 2018, South Korea released the film on DVD with an English dub in it. It is unknown if Warner Bros. will bring out a Region 1 DVD release in the United States.

The original Germany version of the film (with NTSC format) was uploaded by its YouTube channel, Movies [SnoopyPBG 2nd Channel], on November 15, 2021.

Various scenes were deleted from the original version, or shortened, when the film was distributed outside Germany (making the international cut 81 minutes), as follows:
 Scenes in which Dr. Greed attempts to hire an assassin to kill the owner of a rival company are removed entirely.
 The scene in which Fred is tortured by the "tickle torture" machine was greatly shortened in some versions outside Germany, and completely removed in others.
 There is a very awkward scene in the original in which Gwendolyn openly seduces Platini during a song. The scene was cut from international releases, most likely due to the suggestion of bestiality.
 A brief shot in which a bee lands on a magazine photo of a woman's breast was eliminated.
 The German version's ending shows the animals, including Mozart the mouse, drinking wine to celebrate their victory and their future as travelling musicians. This was removed in some international releases.

Merchandise 
Stuffed animals, a soundtrack, Bullyland figures, books and other items were produced for the film's release in Germany.

Television 
The film was broadcast on HBO in 1999, and on Encore in North America. It was also seen on channels such as AB3 (France), Cartoon Network (United Kingdom), Teletoon (Canada), YTV and Treehouse TV. It additionally aired on KidScene: HDNet Movies in March 2018, alongside Cats Don't Dance and Inside Out.

References

External links 

 
 
 

1997 films
1997 animated films
1990s fantasy comedy films
1990s musical comedy films
1990s musical films
German animated films
German children's films
German fantasy films
1990s German-language films
Animated adventure films
Animated comedy films
Animated musical films
1990s children's fantasy films
Animated films about dogs
Films about donkeys
Animated films about cats
Animated films about chickens
Films based on Grimms' Fairy Tales
Films set in Germany
Steampunk films
Warner Bros. animated films
Warner Bros. films
1997 comedy films
1990s children's animated films
1990s English-language films